was briefly the leader of the Yamaguchi-gumi yakuza syndicate in the chaotic years of the Yama-Ichi War. He was also the founder and 1st kumicho of the Nakanishi-gumi.

Nakanishi accepted the temporary leadership position after the assassination of Masahisa Takenaka, but was never considered an official kumicho (supreme Godfather) of the Kobe-based gang, despite heading it from 1985 to 1989.  In 1989, Yoshinori Watanabe was elected as fifth kumicho.

After Watanabe's accession, Nakanishi continued to work for the gang as a senior advisor and leader of 15 sub-gangs in Osaka.  He died in September 2003.

Yakuza members
Yamaguchi-gumi
Japanese crime bosses
1922 births
2003 deaths